Daniel Harrwitz (22 February 1821 – 2 January 1884) was a German chess master.

Harrwitz was born in Breslau (Wrocław) in the Prussian Province of Silesia. Harrwitz's correct birth and death dates (22 February 1821 and 2 January 1884 respectively) were established by Luca D'Ambrosio in Chess Notes item 6286. He established his reputation in Paris, particularly as a player of blindfold games. He lost a match in England to Howard Staunton in 1846 at odds of a pawn and two moves, and drew a match with Adolf Anderssen in Germany in 1848.

Harrwitz lived in England from 1849, and founded the British Chess Review. In 1856, he moved to Paris, where he won a match against Jules Arnous de Rivière. In 1858, he played a match against Paul Morphy in Paris. Harrwitz won the first two games, but lost the match 5½-2½. Harrwitz withdrew from the match, allegedly on grounds of ill health. He subsequently retired to the Austro-Hungarian county of Tyrol, dying in Bolzano in 1884.

Game against Morphy

Although he had a negative record against Morphy, he was one of a few masters who beat Morphy with the black pieces. Here is one of his wins in Paris in 1858:

1.e4 e5 2.Nf3 d6 3.d4 exd4 4.Qxd4 Nc6 5.Bb5 Bd7 6.Bxc6 Bxc6 7.Bg5 Nf6 8.Nc3 Be7 9.O-O-O O-O 10.Rhe1 h6 11.Bh4 Ne8 12.Bxe7 Qxe7 13.e5 Bxf3 14.gxf3 Qg5+ 15.Kb1 dxe5 16.Rxe5 Qg2 17.Nd5 Qxh2 18.Ree1 Qd6 19.Rg1 Kh7 20.Qe3 f5 21.Nf4 Qb6 22.Qe2 Rf7 23.Qc4 Qf6 24.Nh5 Qe7 25.Rde1 Qd7 26.a3 Nd6 27.Qd4 Rg8 28.Rg2 28. Rg2 and Black eventually won.

See also
 List of Jewish chess players

References

External links

Further reading 
 "Daniel Harrwitz (1821-84)" by Edward Winter

1823 births
1884 deaths
19th-century German Jews
German chess players
Jewish chess players
People from the Province of Silesia
Sportspeople from Wrocław
British writers
German chess writers
German male non-fiction writers
19th-century chess players